The women's javelin throw at the 2017 Asian Athletics Championships was held on 6 July.

Results

References
Results

Javelin
Javelin throw at the Asian Athletics Championships